James E. Finnegan (1892–1966) was a politician in the State of Wisconsin.

Biography
Finnegan was born James Edward Finnegan on November 26, 1892 to Irish parents John and Julia Finnegan in Milwaukee, Wisconsin. On September 12, 1916 he married Olive M. Frawley. He died in November 1966. Finnegan received his law degree from Marquette University and was receiving clerk for the Milwaukee County courts. He also taught evening high school classes. Finnegan was Roman Catholic and was a member of the Knights of Columbus.

Career
Finnegan served as Attorney General of Wisconsin from 1933 to 1937. He was an unsuccessful candidate for U.S. Senate from Wisconsin in 1940, losing to incumbent Robert M. La Follette, Jr. He was a Democrat.

See also
List of attorneys general of Wisconsin

References

Politicians from Milwaukee
Marquette University Law School alumni
Wisconsin Attorneys General
Wisconsin Democrats
1892 births
1966 deaths
Date of death missing
Place of death missing
20th-century American politicians
Lawyers from Milwaukee
20th-century American lawyers